Lecithocera poliocoma is a moth in the family Lecithoceridae. It was described by Edward Meyrick in 1916. It is found in northern Australia.

The wingspan is about 12 mm. The forewings are a dark, grey-brown color and the hindwings are grey.

References

Moths described in 1916
poliocoma
Moths of Australia